Grant Township is one of seventeen townships in Boone County, Iowa, USA.  As of the 2000 census, its population was 408.

History
Grant Township was organized in 1871.

Geography
According to the USGS, it contains three cemeteries: Lawn, Renner and Union.

References

External links
 US-Counties.com
 City-Data.com

Townships in Boone County, Iowa
Townships in Iowa
1871 establishments in Iowa